The Irene incident of 1927 was a significant event of the British anti-piracy operations in China during the first half of the 20th century. In an attempt to surprise the pirates of Bias Bay, about sixty miles from Hong Kong, Royal Navy submarines attacked the merchant ship SS Irene, of the China Merchants Steam Navigation Company, which had been taken over by the pirates on the night of 19 October. The British were successful in thwarting the hijacking though they sank the ship.

Background
Following the end of the age of sail, the pirates of southern China were forced to change their tactics when it came to taking over merchant ships. New steam-powered vessels, used both by the navies and the merchants, rendered fleets of heavily armed sailing junks useless. By 1927, the long history of piracy in China continued and the pirates themselves had perfected the tactic of boarding a merchant vessel as passengers and then taking it over while at sea. Some of the most successful groups of pirates at the time were based in Bias Bay; there the outlaws would hijack a vessel as close to the bay as possible before taking it in and anchoring it close to shore for the offloading of everything valuable, including hostages. On more than one occasion, when British warships were sent into the area, the pirates would have been warned ahead and thus escaped arrest. So the Royal Navy created a plan to stealthily patrol the area with submarines. The two submarines left under everybody's assumption that routine exercises were to take place, though they were actually sailing for the bay.

Incident

When the two submarines arrived they were off Mendoza Island (now Shenggao Island) at the entrance of the bay. The two then split up.  L4 went to patrol around the entrance of the bay and Halahan ordered L5 to patrol within. Bias Bay is surrounded by rocks and that night there was a fleet of fishing junks sheltering inside and constantly moving around the anchorage. Both the rocks and the junks made it difficult for the British to monitor the area without being detected, though they succeeded in doing so, and on the morning of 20 October they encountered Irene steaming off Cake Island. She had been taken over by at least eighteen pirates armed with automatic pistols. It was still dark so L4 was surface cruising with one crew at the  gun and another at the vessel's searchlight. Lieutenant Halahan knew that torpedoes were not helpful in recapturing a pirate-held ship but he did have a 4-inch deck gun. Then Irene was spotted so Halahan maneuvered his submarine into position for firing, and when the order was given, the search light was turned on and the gun crew fired a blank warning shot at the steamer. When the shot was ignored a second, live round was fired and it blew a hole straight through the ship and killed a pirate who was standing on deck.

The pirates still paid no attention and continued their attempt to make it to shore, so the 4-inch gun was opened up on them again. By this time L5 had arrived in the area and her crew counted eight muzzle flashes from L4s deck gun. Lieutenant Gilbert Hackforth Jones reported that they were too far away at that time to open fire themselves, but they could see Irene burning after being struck by multiple rounds. At that point Lieutenant Halahan signaled L5 that lifeboats were being lowered from the steamer and that he was maneuvering in to rescue the survivors. L5 followed suit and both submarines dispatched a boat with one officer and one sailor each to go aboard the burning Irene. The pirates on board were counting on this and they were waiting for the British to move in close before responding, and when they did, the pirates revealed themselves from their hiding places and opened fire. Their shots were inaccurate, though, and went over the heads of the sailors.  The submarines then turned around so they could open fire again with their deck guns. After a few additional shots, one struck something flammable on board the steamer and a large, "blinding" explosion was observed. Following that the pirates offered no more resistance and abandoned ship, some of them drowning in the cold water.

Aftermath
Irene was then burning well so additional vessels were sent for. Most of Irenes 258 passengers were saved though fourteen were never seen again. All the survivors were taken on board the submarines and later transferred to the Admiralty S-class destroyer HMS Stormcloud, the cruiser  and the minesweeper HMS Magnolia, which also assisted in putting out the fire on the ship. The British put out the fire but because they had sprayed so much water into the vessel she eventually capsized and sank the following day. Several men received decorations for their conduct in rescuing survivors, including Lieutenant Halahan who received the Distinguished Service Cross. The Hong Kong police managed to filter out several of the pirates who tried to blend in with their hostages during the rescue and seven more were taken by L5. Jones said that they found the pirates naked in a lifeboat and crying so they were assumed to be civilians and taken aboard in blankets. It was a few days later when the crew of L5 were informed that the seven men they picked up were responsible for the hijacking.

In the end, seventeen Chinese were found guilty of piracy and hanged for it in Hong Kong, though some sources say only ten pirates were executed. The owners of Irene later tried to sue Lieutenant Halahan but he won the case on the grounds that any naval commander has the authority to sink any ship controlled by pirates. Irene remained partly underwater for some time, with her masts sticking out, but she was later salvaged and returned to duty.

See also
Piracy in Somalia
Piracy in Nigeria
Piracy on Falcon Lake

Notes

Bibliography

 

History of Hong Kong
Piracy in the South China Sea
Naval battles involving pirates
Naval battles involving the United Kingdom
Maritime incidents in 1927
1927 in Asia
Combat incidents
History of the Royal Navy
October 1927 events